Fernando González defeated Olivier Rochus 6–4, 6–2 to win the 2005 Heineken Open singles competition. Dominik Hrbatý was the defending singles champion of the tennis tournament, held in Auckland, New Zealand.

Seeds
A champion seed is indicated in bold text while text in italics indicates the round in which that seed was eliminated.

  Guillermo Coria (quarterfinals)
  Tommy Robredo (first round)
  Dominik Hrbatý (second round)
  Vincent Spadea (second round)
  Fernando González (champion)
  Juan Ignacio Chela (semifinals)
  Juan Carlos Ferrero (first round)
  Luis Horna (first round)

Draw

References

External links
 Singles draw
 Qualifying Singles draw

Heineken Open
2005 Heineken Open